USS Frigate Bird (AMS/MSC-191) was a  acquired by the US Navy for clearing coastal minefields.

Construction
The second ship in the Navy to be named Frigate Bird, she was laid down 20 July 1953, as AMS-191; launched 24 October 1953, by Quincy Adams Yacht Yard, Inc., Quincy, Massachusetts; sponsored by Mrs. Matthew Gushing; and commissioned 13 January 1955. She was reclassified MSC-191 on 7 February 1955.

East Coast operations 
Joining Mine Force, Atlantic Fleet, at Charleston, South Carolina, 21 February 1955, Frigate Bird began a program of US East Coast and Caribbean training and experimental operations which continued through 1960. Among her activities were amphibious exercises on the beaches near Camp Lejeune, North Carolina, surveying ocean currents, testing a new type of can buoy, and taking part in fleet exercises of various types. From July 1958, she was homeported at Little Creek, Virginia, and served at frequent intervals with the Operational Development Force. This minesweeper also participated in the Cuban Blockade in 1962.

Decommissioning 
Frigate Bird was transferred to Indonesia in 1971, and renamed Pulau Atang (M-721); struck from the US Naval Vessel Register, 1 May 1976; and, disposed of through the Defense Reutilization and Marketing Service for scrap, 1 September 1976.

Notes 

Citations

Bibliography 

Online resources

External links 
 

 

Bluebird-class minesweepers
Ships built in Quincy, Massachusetts
1953 ships
Cold War minesweepers of the United States
Pulau Atang
Ships transferred from the United States Navy to the Indonesian Navy
Adjutant-class minesweepers